John F. Smith (born c. 1921) was an English footballer who played for Port Vale, before transferring to Chelsea just before the outbreak of World War II.

Career
Smith joined Port Vale in September 1938. He scored on his debut at inside-right in a 4–0 win over Walsall in a first round Southern Section Cup match at The Old Recreation Ground on 26 September. He made 13 Third Division South and five cup appearances in 1938–39, before he transferred to Chelsea in May 1939.

Career statistics
Source:

References

Footballers from Stoke-on-Trent
English footballers
Association football midfielders
Port Vale F.C. players
Chelsea F.C. players
English Football League players
1920s births
Year of death missing
Brentford F.C. wartime guest players